Kelvis Ochoa (born in 1970) is a Cuban author, composer, and singer.

At age 3, his parents moved to Isla de la Juventud ("Isle of Youth") where he grew up, situated about 100 kilometres south of the Havana, Cuba shore.

He is generally considered to be very popular with young Cubans and famous worldwide for having co-composed the original soundtrack from the movie Habana Blues. He is also part of the Cuban band Habana Abierta.

History

Childhood

Ochoa was born in Las Tunas, Cuba in 1970.

Ochoa's father was a percussionist in his grandfather's band, and when he heard them perform it inspired him to pursue music. Ochoa started playing conga tunes in the streets with his friends, and had his first stage performance when he was 14. At the performance he sang a tune by Cuban Sucu Sucu player Mongo Rives at an inter-school festival. He started to take guitar lessons and write poetry and songs. He tended to avoid any form of classical music training. Press agents called him "the Idol of Youth from the Isle of Youth".

Musical Style
His hometown had a substantial influence on his current music. La Isla de la Juventud is the cradle of the musical style known as sucu-sucu, where a soloist improvises in response to a repeated chorus, and is also accompanied by the instruments. This very traditional Cuban music became the trademark of Kelvis Ochoa; he mixes traditional Cuban rhythms (Sucu Sucu, Cha Cha Cha, Macuta, Songo, etc.) with modern music like funk, rock, and international pop.

Career
After moving to Havana in 1992 and forming a rock band called Cuatro Gatos (Four Cats), a significant moment for Kelvis Ochoa’s arrived when he met the Cuban musician Pável Urkiza. Urkiza, who was part of the well-known Cuban duo "Gema y Pavel," was starting to make his name in the music production field and decided to produce Kelvis Ochoa on Habana Oculta. This was a July 1996 compilation of Cuban artists on the Madrid-based Nubenegra label. This record led to the formation of the band that would call itself Habana Abierta. They were rapidly met with success with the hit record Havana Abierta on the Spanish label BMG Ariola. After selling out concerts in Spain in the 1990s, they triumphantly returned to Cuba in 2003 for a show at La Tropical. A documentary was filmed about them, directed by Jorge Perugorría and Arturo Soto.

Kelvis Ochoa also started a solo career with his album Kelvis (BMG Ariola, 2001). Descemer Bueno, another Cuban musician, produced and co-wrote the album Amor y Música, released in 2009 on Cuba’s EGREM label.

Together, the two men won the 2006 Goya and the 2006 “Premio de la Musica of the best movie soundtrack” for Havana Blues.

In 2013-14, Swiss film-maker Beat Borter made a documentary: "Yo sé de un lugar - Música y vida de Kelvis Ochoa" (I Know of a Place - the music and life of Kelvis Ochoa): Musician, poet, cook, dreamer… The ongoing voyage of Kelvis Ochoa living his music. Places and personalities have marked his life, work, generation, and Cuban culture.

Awards
2006: Premio de la Musica of the best movie soundtrack for Habana Blues (Madrid, Spain)
2006: Goya of the best movie soundtrack for Habana Blues (Academia de las Artes y las Ciencias Cinematográficas de España)

Discography
 1996: Habana Oculta (compilation, BMG Ariola)
 1997: Habana Abierta (with Habana Abierta, BMG Ariola)
 1999: 24 Horas (with Habana Abierta, BMG Ariola)
 1999: La Isla
 2001: Kelvis (BMG Ariola)
 2005: Boomerang (con Habana Abierta)
 2008: Amor Y Musica (EGREM)
 2014: Dolor con amor se cura (BIS)
 2018: Calle Amores (Universal)
 2021: 50 Grados (BisMusic)

References

havana-cultura.com

External links
 Myspace page
 
 Para Dar A Luz by Kelvis Ochoa Y 4 Gatos on Yahoo
 cubaabsolutely.com/music/contemporary.htm
 "Havana, Havana!", PBS TV documentary series, July 27, 2012. Interview with Kelvis Ochoa.
  http://vimeo.com/100750847  Trailer "Yo sé de un lugar - Música y vida de Kelvis Ochoa". Documentary. Switzerland/Cuba 2014, 97'

1970 births
Cuban musicians
Living people